Silvia Emilia Degante Romero (born 6 August 1969) is a Mexican politician from the National Action Party. From 2006 to 2009 she served as Deputy of the LX Legislature of the Mexican Congress representing San Luis Potosí.

References

1969 births
Living people
People from San Luis Potosí
National Action Party (Mexico) politicians
21st-century Mexican politicians
Deputies of the LX Legislature of Mexico
Members of the Chamber of Deputies (Mexico) for San Luis Potosí